Cryptoblepharus keiensis is a species of lizard in the family Scincidae. It is endemic to Indonesia.

References

Cryptoblepharus
Reptiles of Indonesia
Endemic fauna of Indonesia
Reptiles described in 1910
Taxa named by Jean Roux